Lary Seven (also known as Lary 7) is an American  multi-instrumentalist based in New York. He was the subject of the documentary Not Junk Yet - The Art of Lary 7, directed by Danielle de Picciotto. He has worked with artists such as Swans and Jarboe.

References

External links

Living people
American bass guitarists
American post-punk musicians
Musicians from New York (state)
Guitarists from New York City
1956 births